Rob Fairweather is an American economist and government official who served as the acting director of the Office of Management and Budget from January 20, 2021, to March 24, 2021.

Career
Fairweather first served as a Labor Economist in the Department of Labor from 1975 to 1977. He also served as Budget Examiner and Chief of the Environment Branch at OMB. He then served as the Deputy Associate Director for Natural Resources at OMB from 2001 to 2010. In that role, Fairweather was responsible for a number of federal agencies, including the Department of Agriculture, the Department of the Interior, and the Environmental Protection Agency.

References

Biden administration cabinet members
Living people
Year of birth missing (living people)
United States Office of Management and Budget officials